The 3rd PGA Golden Laurel Awards, honoring the best film and television producers of 1991, were held at the Beverly Wilshire Hotel in Los Angeles, California on March 4, 1992. The nominees were announced on January 28, 1992.

Winners and nominees

Film

Television

Special

References

 1991
1991 film awards
1991 television awards